The World Federation of the Deaf (WFD) is an international non-governmental organization that acts as a peak body for national associations of Deaf people, with a focus on Deaf people who use sign language and their family and friends. WFD aims to promote the Human Rights of Deaf people worldwide, by working closely with the United Nations (with which it has consultative status) and various UN agencies such as the International Labour Organization (ILO) and the World Health Organization (WHO). WFD is also a member of the International Disability Alliance (IDA).

The current 11 board members are all deaf. The offices are located in Helsinki, Finland.

History
The WFD was established in September 1951 in Rome, Italy, at the first World Deaf Congress, under the auspices of Ente Nazionale Sordomuti (ENS), the Italian Deaf Association. The first president of WFD was Professor Vittorio Ieralla, who was also, at that time, president of the ENS. The congress was attended by representatives from 25 countries.

Dr. Cesare Magarotto was one of the founders of World Federation of the Deaf and its first General Secretary (1951-1987) along with Vittorio Ieralla who was elected as the President from 1951 to 1955.

Ieralla and Magarotto successfully convinced the Italian government to support their efforts to establish a WFD General Secretariat in Rome, in 1951. With continued support from the Italian government and later with the ENS, the WFD General Secretariat was able to establish informative and advocacy networks, with national federations of the Deaf around the world. Decades later, the WFD General Secretariat relocated to Finland (1987), with support from the Finnish government and the Finnish national of the Deaf led by the former WFD General Secretary Dr. Liisa Kauppinen (WFD President Emeritius).

Status
WFD has B-category status with the United Nations and is represented on the following groups':

Economic and Social Council (ECOSOC)
Regional Commissions
Economic Commission for Africa (ECA)
Economic Commission for Europe (ECE)
Economic Commission for Latin America and the Caribbean (ECLAC)
Economic Commission and Social Commission for Asia and the Pacific (ESCAP)
Economic and Social Commission for Western Asia (ESCWA)
Panel of Experts on the UN Standard Rules for the Equalization of  Opportunities for Persons with Disabilities
Office of the United Nations High Commissioner for Human Rights (OHCHR)
United Nations Educational, Scientific and Cultural Organization (UNESCO)
International Labour Organization (ILO)  
World Health Organization (WHO)
World Bank
Council of Europe

WFD provides expert advice on Deaf issues in its relationship with other international organizations and professional groups.

The legal seat of WFD is in Helsinki, Finland.

Aims and objectives
At present, emphasis is placed on the following areas:

Improve the status of national sign languages,
Better education for Deaf people,
Improve access to information and services
Improve human rights for Deaf people in developing countries
Promote the establishment of Deaf organisations where none currently exist

Constituency
The WFD claims to represent 70 million deaf people worldwide, of which more than 80 percent live in developing countries. This is done mainly through membership of national deaf organisations, where such organisations exist. , 130 national associations are members. Associate members, international members and individual members also make up WFD's membership base.

List of member associations (as of June 2021):

World Congress
The World Congress of the World Federation of the Deaf has been held every four years since 1951. Organised by the WFD and the host country, this event is attended by thousands of Deaf people from all over the world. As well as convening the General Assembly (the highest decision-making body of the WFD) and forming the guidelines for the next four years of its work, the congress holds a large cultural program including theatre performances, cinema, exhibitions, performing arts, visits to local places of interest.

During the 14th Congress the World Association of Sign Language Interpreters (WASLI) was established.

Presidents
1951-1955 : Vittorio Ieralla  
1955-1983 :  Dragoljub Vukotić 
1983-1995 :  Yerker Andersson(1929-2016 aged:87)  
1995-2003 :  Liisa Kauppinen 
2003-2011 : Markku Jokinen 
2011-2019 : Colin Allen (WFD President) 
2019- : Joseph Murray

See also
International Day of Sign Languages
International Sign
List of sign languages
European Union of the Deaf
National Association of the Deaf (United States)
National Association of the Deaf (Italy)
European Union of the Deaf Young
World Association of Sign Language Interpreters
World Federation of the Deaf Young Section

References

External links

Deaf culture
Deafness rights organizations
Disability rights organizations
Organizations established in 1951
1951 establishments in Italy
International organisations based in Finland